Bryan Bickell (born March 9, 1986) is a Canadian former professional ice hockey player who played for the Chicago Blackhawks and the Carolina Hurricanes of the National Hockey League (NHL). He won the Stanley Cup with the Chicago Blackhawks in 2013 and 2015, and played in four early playoff games during the team's run to the 2010 Stanley Cup championship. Bickell spent nearly 10 years with the Blackhawks organization before being traded to the Hurricanes before the  season. He was diagnosed with multiple sclerosis later that year and retired from playing hockey at the end of the season.

Early life
Bryan Bickell was born to Bill and Anne Bickell. He was raised in Orono, Ontario with an older sister, Ashley. In addition to hockey, Bickell was also interested in playing baseball during his youth. He was an outfielder and pitcher for the Kendal Royals, where he was scouted by the New York Yankees. Bickell ultimately choose to focus his career on hockey, and traveled to Ottawa to play for the Ottawa 67's. Bickell had several jobs prior to becoming a full-time hockey player. He worked as a construction worker and as a clubhouse assistant to the Ottawa Senators, where he cleaned laundry and performed custodian duties.

Playing career

Amateur career
Bickell grew up playing minor ice hockey with the Orono Leafs program, before playing AAA for the Central Ontario Wolves. He played in the 2000 Quebec International Pee-Wee Hockey Tournament with the Toronto Red Wings.

For his Bantam season, Bickell was moved to the Toronto Red Wings of the GTHL for one season before being drafted in the second round (36th overall) in the 2002 OHL Priority Selection by the Ottawa 67's. Bickell was a member of the Bantam All-Ontario champions Toronto Red Wings with future Chicago Blackhawk teammate Dave Bolland.

Professional career
The Blackhawks drafted Bickell in the second round of the 2004 NHL Entry Draft  with the 41st overall pick.  After signing a three-year entry-level contract in 2006, Bickell left the Ontario Hockey League to play for the Norfolk Admirals of the American Hockey League (AHL) during the 2006–07 season. Bickell later made his NHL debut on April 5, 2007, where he scored his first goal against the Detroit Red Wings.

Bickell spent the majority of the next three seasons playing in the AHL. The Blackhawks recalled him for the 2010 Stanley Cup playoffs. Bickell appeared in four post-season games with one assist and a plus-3 rating. Bickell and the Blackhawks defeated the Philadelphia Flyers in the 2010 Stanley Cup Finals. Bickell received a ring from the Blackhawks, but his name was not inscribed on the Cup.
  
Bickell became a mainstay on the Blackhawks during the 2010–11 season. In his first full year in the NHL, Bickell recorded a career-high 17 goals and 20 assists in 78 appearances. His offensive production dropped during the 2011–12 campaign, where he only tallied nine goals and 15 assists.

Bickell was highly productive during the 2013 Stanley Cup Playoffs. He scored nine goals and eight assists during the post-season. He recorded the game-tying goal during Game 6 of the Stanley Cup Final. The Blackhawks later scored the go-ahead goal 17 seconds later to win the Stanley Cup. The Blackhawks awarded Bickell's strong post-season performance with a four-year, $16 million contract.

Bickell tallied 14 goals and 14 assists during the regular season while appearing in 80 regular season games in the 2014-15 NHL season. His production declined in the postseason, where he recorded only five assists. Bickell was scratched from the team's lineup for two games of the 2015 Stanley Cup Finals due to health-related issues. The Blackhawks defeated the Tampa Bay Lightning in six games, giving Bickell his third Stanley Cup.

The Blackhawks unsuccessfully attempted to trade Bickell prior to the 2015–16 NHL season. The team initially waived Bickell but reinserted him into their roster as the season started. Bickell was unable to consistently perform due to health-related issues and spent much of the season with the Rockford IceHogs of the American Hockey League. Bickell skated in 25 games for the Blackhawks and recorded two assists. He played in 47 contests for the IceHogs where he scored 15 goals and 16 assists.

During the 2016 off-season, Bickell's $4-million salary cap-hit posed a serious problem to the Blackhawks, who were struggling to stay below the NHL's salary cap. The team again shopped Bickell to other teams, but few teams seemed to be interested in him and his $4 million cap hit. The Blackhawks eventually traded Bickell along with Teuvo Teräväinen at the 2016 NHL Entry Draft to the Carolina Hurricanes in exchange for a 2016 second-round pick (originally acquired from the NY Rangers – used to select Artur Kayumov) and a 2017 third-round pick. The Hurricanes also agreed to accept Bickell's cap-hit and remaining contract. Bickell scored one goal in seven games for the Hurricanes, before experiencing health issues again. The Hurricanes announced that Bickell had been diagnosed with multiple sclerosis and placed him on injured reserve on November 12.

Bickell began practicing with the Hurricanes again in January 2017. The Hurricanes assigned him to the Charlotte Checkers for conditioning on February 24. Bickell returned to the Hurricanes on April 5 and skated in his first NHL game since leaving for MS treatment in November. Bickell played the final game of his career on April 9, scoring the only shootout goal of his career in the Hurricanes' 4−3 win against the Flyers. He concluded his NHL career with 66 goals and 70 assists over 395 NHL games. He also tallied 20 goals and 19 assists in 75 postseason games.

Retirement
Bickell announced his retirement on April 8, 2017. He played his final game on April 9 against the Philadelphia Flyers. The NHL honored Bickell's career at the 2017 NHL Awards ceremony and commended him for showing perseverance while battling multiple sclerosis. On October 4, Bickell signed a ceremonial one-day contract with the Blackhawks to retire with the team. The Blackhawks honored Bickell at the United Center before their 2017–18 season opener on October 5.

Health issues
Bickell began experiencing symptoms of vertigo that forced him to miss two games during the 2015 Stanley Cup Finals. He initially believed the ailment was caused by an infected tooth. Bickell's agent later commented that Bickell had developed vestibular issues, which hindered his performance during the 2015–16 Chicago Blackhawks season. In November 2016, Bickell began experiencing an unexplained pain in his shoulder and leg that caused him to miss multiple games. Doctors later diagnosed Bickell with multiple sclerosis. Bickell commented on his health by stating, "Since the 2015 playoffs, I've been struggling to understand what was going on with my body. Again during the past few weeks, it felt like something wasn't right." Ron Francis, the Hurricanes' general manager, stated that Bickell would take an indefinite amount of time off from hockey to receive treatment for his condition. While Bickell ultimately returned to Hurricanes towards the end of the 2016–17 season, he announced he would retire from playing hockey to focus on his MS treatment.

Personal life
On August 3, 2013, Bickell married his longtime girlfriend, Amanda Caskenette. They have two daughters, Kinslee and Makayla. Bickell and his wife established the "Bryan & Amanda Bickell Foundation", which helps rescue abused pit bulls.

Career statistics

Awards and honours

References

External links

The Players Tribune - Grinder by Bryan Bickell

1986 births
Living people
Canadian ice hockey left wingers
Carolina Hurricanes players
Charlotte Checkers (2010–) players
Chicago Blackhawks draft picks
Chicago Blackhawks players
Ice hockey people from Ontario
Norfolk Admirals players
Orli Znojmo players
Ottawa 67's players
Rockford IceHogs (AHL) players
Sportspeople from Clarington
Stanley Cup champions
Windsor Spitfires players
People with multiple sclerosis
Canadian expatriate ice hockey players in the Czech Republic
Canadian expatriate ice hockey players in the United States